Nick Zimmermann (born 30 August 1994) is Danish politician serving as Member of the Folketing for the Danish People's Party since the 2022 general election.

Career 
Zimmermann, a logistics and storage operator by profession, started his career in politics in 2021 when he won election to the municipal council of Randers Municipality with 990 personal votes. A year later in 2022, Zimmermann won election to the Folketing with 1,039 personal votes.

Personal life 
Zimmermann is engaged and has one child.

References 

1994 births
Danish People's Party politicians
Living people
Members of the Folketing 2022–2026
People from Aarhus